The Spiders were a Japanese rock band formed in Tokyo in 1961, as one of the leading groups of the Group Sounds genre.

History
Band members were Hiroshi "Monsieur" Kamayatsu (rhythm guitar and backing singer), Jun Inoue (singer), Masaaki Sakai (tambourine and backing singer), Shochi Tanabe (drums), Takayuki Inoue (lead guitar and backing singer), Mitsuru Kato (bass guitar) and Katsuo Ōno (electronic organ and steel guitar). They had many hit singles, made feature films and were popular in the late 1960s and early 1970s in Japan. They toured Europe in 1966, and the United States, including Hawaii, in 1967. Most of the band members are still active in the music industry, with the exception of Monsieur, who died on 1 March 2017 and Takayuki Inoue, who died on 2 May 2018.

Their biggest selling record was "Yuhiganaiteiru" which sold over 1.2 million copies, and was awarded a gold disc.

Selected discography

Albums
Album No. 1 (Rel. April 15th, 1966)
Album No. 2 (Rel. June 1st, 1966)
Album No. 3 (Rel. February 1st, 1967)
The Spiders Meets The Savage (Rel. March 1967)
Album No. 4 (Rel. September 5th, 1967)
Album No. 5 (Rel. March 15th, 1968)
Meiji Hyakunen Spiders Nana Nen (Rel. October 25th, 1968)
The Spiders '69 (Rel. May 25th, 1969)
Rock 'N' Roll Renaissance (Rel. May 25th, 1970)

Singles 

 Furi Furi b/w Monkey Dance (Crown CW-291 - Rel. May 10th, 1965)
 Etenraku Go, Go b/w Twilight Zone (Victor SS-1597 - Rel. November 15th, 1965)
 No No Boy b/w Little Robby (Philips SFL-1034 - Rel. February 1st, 1966)
 Seishun a Go Go b/w Kurai Ando Kurai (Crown CW-444 - Rel. March 10th, 1966)
 Hey Boy b/w Michelle (Philips SFL-1043 - Rel. April 15th, 1966)
 Summer Girl b/w Up-Side-Down (Philips SFL-1057 - Rel. July 1st, 1966)
 Yuhiganaiteiru b/w Chibi No Julie (Philips FS-1003 - Rel. September 15, 1966)
 Nantonaku Nantonaku b/w Boom Boom (Philips FS-1007 - Rel. December 25th, 1966)
 Taiyo No Tsubasa b/w Sora No Hiroba (Philips FS-1013 - Rel. March 1st, 1967)
 Balla Balla b/w Land Of 1,000 Dances (Philips FS-1014 - Rel. April 20th, 1967)
 Kazeganaiteiru b/w Kimi Ni Ageyou (Philips FS-1020 - Rel. July 15th, 1967)
 Ano Niji Wo Tsukamo b/w Koi No Doctor (Philips FS-1022 - Rel. August 25th, 1967)
 Itsumademo Dokomademo b/w Ban Ban Ban (Philips FS-1030 - Rel. October 25th, 1967)
 Anotoki Kimi Wa Wakakatta b/w Mo Ichido Mo Ichido (Philips FS-1040 - Rel. March 5th, 1968)
 Shinjyu No Namida b/w Akai Dress No Onna No Ko (Philips FS-1050 - Rel. June 5th, 1968)
 Kuroyuri No Uta b/w Rock And Roll Boy (Philips FS-1060 - Rel. September 5th, 1968)
 Glass No Seijo b/w Kaze Wa Liyatsu (Philips FS-1065 - Rel. November 25th, 1968)

Films
Friends (1964, Nikkatsu)                Director: Nozomu Yanase
Highland Lady (1965, Nikkatsu)              Director: Nozomu Yanase
Youth A Go-Go (1966, Nikkatsu)    Director: Kenjiro Morinaga
Goodbye Mr. Tear (1966, Nikkatsu)               Director: Shōgorō Nishimura
You Are A Lover (1967, Nikkatsu)              Director: Buichi Saitō
Kigeki ekimae hyakku-nen (1967, Toho)                 Director: Shirō Toyoda
The Sunset Is Crying (1967, Nikkatsu)    Director: Kenjiro Morinaga
Wild Scheme A Go Go (1967, Nikkatsu)    Director: Buichi Saitō
Go Forward! (1968, Nikkatsu)                 Director: Kō Nakahira
Big Commotion! (1968, Nikkatsu)          Director: Kenjiro Morinaga
Road To Bali (1968, Nikkatsu)                    Director: Katsumi Nishikawa
The Wonderful Ones (1968, Shochiku)                Director: Kōichi Saitō
Nippon oyafukō jidai (1968, Toho)                         Director: Kunihiko Yamamoto

References

External links
 The Spiders on Radio Diffusion
 The Spiders film: Wild Scheme A-Go-Go 1967
 The Spiders film: Big Commotion 1968
 The Spiders film: Go Forward 1968
 The Spiders film: The Road To Bali 1968

Japanese rock music groups
Philips Records artists
Japanese garage rock groups